Rhydian is a male given name of Welsh origin.

References

Welsh masculine given names